Tapoa is one of the 45 provinces of Burkina Faso. It is located in the Est Region. Its capital is Diapaga.

Departments
Tapoa is divided into 8 departments:

See also
Regions of Burkina Faso
Provinces of Burkina Faso
Departments of Burkina Faso

References

 
Provinces of Burkina Faso